Amer Masarwa (born March 26, 1995) is an Arab-Israeli footballer who plays for Ihud Bnei Kafr Qara.

References

External links
 

1995 births
Living people
Israeli footballers
Maccabi Netanya F.C. players
Hapoel Ironi Baqa al-Gharbiyye F.C. players
Hapoel Beit She'an F.C. players
Ihud Bnei Kafr Qara F.C. players
People from Baqa al-Gharbiyye
Footballers from Haifa District
Liga Leumit players
Israeli Premier League players
Association football defenders
Israeli people of Egyptian descent
Arab citizens of Israel
Arab-Israeli footballers
Israeli Muslims